Tracy Ainsworth is a marine biologist and Scientia Professor at the University of New South Wales, working on coral reefs, and the biology of the Great Barrier Reef. Her research covers the biology of stresses, cells, disease, immunity and sympbios. She was awarded the Dorothy Hill Medal for science, from the Australian Academy of Science, for research on coral reef, stresses and impacts of temperature on coral health.

Career 
Ainsworth's career has examined impacts of environmental stress on corals, particularly reef-building corals, together with the interactions between hosts  and microbe. She also studies symbioses and disease outbreaks. Research around bacterial associates of corals opened up knowledge around the mechanisms of coral diseases, how these occur and what causes them to progress.

Ainsworth has also identified a range of novel intracellular bacteria which may play a role in the success of corals. She has also examined the impacts of rising temperatures, and climate change, and how this will affect coral both at present, and in future climates. Ainsworth has published studies on the impacts of rising water temperatures on corals.

Publications 

Selected peer-reviewed journal articles include the following:

 Ainsworth, Tracy D., andGates, Ruth D. (2016) Corals’ microbial sentinels: the coral microbiome will be key to future reef health. Science, 352 (6293). pp. 1518–1519.
 Kelly, Lisa A.,Heintz, Tom, Lamb, Joleah B., Ainsworth, Tracy D., and Willis, Bette L. (2016) Ecology and pathology of novel plaque-like growth anomalies affecting a reef-building coral on the Great Barrier Reef. Frontiers in Marine Science, 3. pp. 1–12.
 Ainsworth, Tracy D.,Heron, Scott F., Ortiz, Juan Carlos, Mumby, Peter J., Grech, Alana, Ogawa, Daisie, Eakin, C. Mark, and Leggat, William (2016) Climate change disables coral bleaching protection on the Great Barrier Reef. Science, 352 (6283). pp. 338–342.

She has also published a book:

 Graham NAJ; Ainsworth TD; Baird AH; Ban NC; Bay LK; Cinner JE; De Freitas DM; Diaz-Pulido G; Dornelas M; Dunn SR; Fidelman PIJ; Foret S; Good TC; Kool J; Mallela J; Penin L; Pratchett MS; Williamson DH, 2011, From microbes to people: Tractable benefits of no-take areas for coral reefs.

Media 
Ainsworth has published on coral reefs and marine science within The Conversation, where together with researchers from other Australian universities, she described the impacts of coral bleaching, in the Lord Howe Island Marine Park. She has also had her work described by the ABC.

Awards 

 2018 - Dorothy Hill Medal
 2012 - ARC Super Science Fellow (2012-2015)
 2011 - L'Oreal Women in Science Fellowship.

References 

Living people
Australian women academics
Year of birth missing (living people)
Women marine biologists
James Cook University alumni
Academic staff of the University of New South Wales
Australian women biologists